Savita Bhabhi  is an Indian animated adult film  created by UK-based businessman Puneet Agarwal (also known as Deshmukh). It was released on 4 May 2013. The film was released on Web in India because of censorship reasons.

Plot 
In the year 2070, Bombay city is a super high-tech metro consisting of flying cars. Fuel is still petrol though. Because humans have found unlimited oil reserves on the Moon, everyone is happy in the city except a guy named Suraj, frustrated due to porn ban. He desperately searches for online porn but finds no video content; however, he discovers Kirtu and Savita Bhabhi.

Excited, he rides his flying scooter to his friend Hari's place. This Hari is a tech genius who made a virtual reality simulator to experience digital dimension. Suraj insists Hari to try Savita Bhabhi. They go into the comics dimension in the event of strip poker in Savita Bhabhi episode 17; "Double Trouble 2".

After an exciting game they accidentally come back to the movie's dimension with Savita Bhabhi due to a thunder strike on the house. Anxious Bhabhi demands to return but Hari says that machine is broken and he needs some time to fix it. Suraj comforts Bhabhi and they spend some quality time together. She gets to know about the plight of Suraj, that the tech minister Mr. Rakesh Mehta banned all porn websites. Bhabhi remarks that surely he doesn't get fornication at home,and that's why he unleashes his frustration on the people.

Hari explains to Suraj and Bhabhi that his supplier got raided. All the parts needed to fix the machine is now in custody of tech minister. Bhabhi suggests to steal the parts. Hari makes plans and Savita Bhabhi goes full on secret agent in her own enchanting style.

Voice cast 
 Rozlyn Khan as Savita Bhabhi

References

External links
 
 

Pornographic animation
2010s Hindi-language films
Indian animated films
2013 animated films
2013 films
Censorship in India
Animated films based on comics
Indian erotic films
Indian animated short films
Indian pornography
Indian science fiction films
Films set in the 2070s
Indian direct-to-video films
2013 direct-to-video films
Films based on Indian comics
Films set in Mumbai